Acleris micropterana is a species of moth of the family Tortricidae. It is found in China (Beijing, Heilongjiang).

The wingspan is 9.6–15.4 mm. The forewings are greyish white with a dark brown basal blotch and a dark brown triangular area in the middle. The hindwings are brown. Adults have been recorded on wing in July and August.

References

Moths described in 1993
micropterana
Moths of Asia